Kazakh wrestling was introduced by Kazakh people back in ancient times. The winner of Kazakh wrestling earns greater respect from the people. For example, Kazhymukan Munaitpasov was a well-known Kazakh wrestler who made it on the world sports' fame list for his achievements.

History:
The earliest rock paintings of Kazakh wrestling can be traced back to 1200 to 600 BC. Kazakh wrestling was a central part of military training in an age in which battles were fought on chariots. A soldier had to possess excellent balance while standing on a chariot and fighting using spear and bow. Another point was that a soldier had to be skillful using both the right and left hand as an opponent could be on his right or left while driving a chariot. The purpose of wrestling seemed to be threefold.

1. to train the soldier in balance while handling the chariot.

2. the wrestling matches were closely related to religion and served ritualistic purposes.

3. to train the soldiers in close combat, allowing him to knock or throw his opponent off balance while at the same time maintaining his own. When people began to wear heavier armor wrestling became even more important as sword fights could quickly turn into grappling situations.

Techniques:
Designed for close combat the techniques were aimed at knocking an opponent off balance from a standing position. This allowed a soldier to use fighting techniques in a real battle at close proximity, when he had a weapon in his hands.
The Techniques and methods used in Kazakh wrestling have strong similarities with the ones found in Judo and Mongolian wrestling. Victory is achieved when the opponent is thrown flat on the back. Points can also be achieved by throwing the opponent on the side or forcing him to a knee. 
The goal of Kazakh wrestling is to throw the opponent on the floor while remaining standing or falling atop of him. As a result of this sacrifice throws and throws that cause the thrower to drop to one or two knees are not favored. 
The wrestlers are not allowed to touch the legs but can freely grab the jacket and the belt of the opponent.

Etiquete:
Before the match the wrestler places the hand on his/her chest and bows. The wrestler then greets the opponent with a hug before stepping backwards after which the referee gives the signal for the match.

The first competition by Kazakh wrestling was held in village sports festival in 1938. After that the competitions are traditionally held in the cities of the republic. The first international tournament was held in 1952 among Asian participants. When Kazakhstan gained its independence, popularity of Kazakh wrestling extremely increased. Since 1991, the national championships and the leagues are being held every year.

Kazakhs organized International Kazakh Wrestling Federation (IKWF) in World Congress in Berlin in 2004. Serik Tukiev became the first federation president.

The first Asian Championship by Kazakh wrestling was held in Altaisky Krai, Russia in 2005. There was a big international tournament named after Kazakhstan's president in November, 2005. More than 100 athletes from 25 countries participated there. Among them were Germany, Turkey, the Netherlands, France and others. Mongolia held II Asian Championship in July, 2011. Kazakh wrestling championship was held in August 2011.

This game intensify the human body, strengthens muscles, teaches tolerance, bravery, agility, trains to think clearly and find a way out of problematic situations. It is also the national art of self-defense. Wrestlers gain the ability to use all the strength in their body. That means they're allowed to employ all the methods on the belt and above. The point is to throw the opponent with his back down.

The wrestlers are divided into 3 groups depending on their age and 8 categories depending on weight. Adults compete for 10 minutes and teenagers for 5 minutes. Kazakh wrestling is included in zonal, regional, republican sports festival programs, teams are honoured throughout the Kazakhstan territory.

References

 http://confederation.kz/en/confederation/news/federatsiya-kazak-kuresi-rk-voshla-v-sostav-konfederatsii
 https://web.archive.org/web/20160306001257/http://kazakhkures.kz/
 https://rekvizitai.vz.lt/en/company/european_kazakh_kuresi_federation/
 https://e-history.kz/en/publications/view/656
 https://openaccess.leidenuniv.nl/bitstream/handle/1887/63912/Master%27s%20thesis%20RES%20Sjoerd%20Blankevoort.pdf?sequence=1

Wrestling in Kazakhstan